Ionel Georgian Mișu (born 24 July 2001) is a Romanian professional footballer who plays as a goalkeeper for Concordia Chiajna. He made his debut in Liga I on 2 June 2019, in a match between Gaz Metan Mediaș and Concordia Chiajna, ended with the score of 3-1.

References

External links
 
 Georgian Mișu at lpf.ro

2001 births
Living people
People from Drobeta-Turnu Severin
Romanian footballers
Association football goalkeepers
Liga I players
Liga II players
CS Concordia Chiajna players